There are many different types of gliding possum, sometimes referred to as volplane possum, flying phalangers, or simply as gliders:

Australian gliders
 Feathertail glider or pygmy gliding possum, Acrobates pygmaeus
 Greater glider, Petauroides volans
 Mahogany glider, Petaurus gracilis
 Squirrel glider, Petaurus norfolcensis
 Sugar glider, Petaurus breviceps
 Yellow-bellied glider or fluffy glider, Petaurus australis

New Guinea gliders
 Biak glider, Petaurus biacensis
 Northern glider, Petaurus abidi

A characteristic of all species of marsupial gliders is the partially fused (syndactylous) second and third digits on the hind feet.  They achieve gliding flight by use of membranes called patagia.

References 

 
Diprotodonts